"Wild Wild Life" is a song by American rock band Talking Heads, released as the lead single from their seventh studio album True Stories. It was the band's third and last top 40 hit on the U.S. Billboard Hot 100.

Reception
Cash Box called it "quirky and typically fun."  Billboard said that the Talking Heads "put a minimal post-new wave accompaniment to a bouncy singalong tune."

Music video
The video for the song won "Best Group Video" at the MTV Video Music Awards in 1987. Taken from the film True Stories, with some additional content, it includes band member Jerry Harrison parodying Billy Idol, Kid Creole, Ralph Macchio's character Karate Kid, and Prince. "My favorite T. Heads video, the most fun to make," Harrison recalled in the liner notes of Once in a Lifetime: The Best of Talking Heads. "I always wondered what Prince thought of it." The rest of the band also appears in various costumes.

The video is set in a 1960s ambienced cabaret bar, where a frantic series of unannounced performers lip sync to the song, imitating such singers as Madonna and Meat Loaf as disjointed images play across a wall of video screens behind them. Byrne wrote about this scene:
The song itself becomes a vehicle that can say anything they want it to. Some gestures and movements are obviously derived from well-known sources: television shows ... movies ... and, most recently, rock videos. Odd to think that some lip-synchers are imitating characters in videos, who are really musicians imitating other characters.

Actor John Goodman, prior to his fame in the sitcom Roseanne, appeared in both the film and MTV versions of the video. Goodman was also featured on the B-side's "People Like Us", a song that also appeared in the film.

Track listing

7-inch single

12-inch single 

 vocals on "People Like Us (Movie Version)" by John Goodman

Charts

Weekly Charts

Year-end charts

Use in media
The song was covered by Wailing Souls for the 1993 movie Cool Runnings.

The song was used in the trailers for Brother Bear, Over the Hedge, and Zookeeper, as well as the beginning of the 2006 animated film Open Season, for which it was included on the film's soundtrack. It was also used in the 2014 film United Passions as well as the aforementioned True Stories.

References

1986 singles
Talking Heads songs
Songs written by David Byrne
Sire Records singles
Song recordings produced by David Byrne
Song recordings produced by Jerry Harrison
1986 songs
Electronic rock songs